Tomáš Mičola (born 26 September 1988) is a Czech football player.

Mičola played for Czech youth national teams since the under-16 level. He played at the 2007 FIFA U-20 World Cup, where the Czech Republic won silver medals.

Career
Mičola started to play football at SFC Opava. At the age of 16 he moved to FC Baník Ostrava, where he quickly progressed and at the age of 18 started to appear in league matches. At the age of 21 he already appeared in almost 100 league matches.

Due to a knee injury, Mičola ended his professional career in 2018 and signed to play for Czech amateur club SK Dětmarovice in September 2018. In the winter 2020, Mičola moved to FC Odra Petřkovice.

In August 2020 it was confirmed, that Mičola would play for the reserve team of his former club, Baník Ostrava, with a mentor role for the young players of the team. However, on 9 February 2021, he also featured in a game for Baník Ostrava's professional team in the Czech Cup against FC Slavia Karlovy Vary where he played 27 minutes.

Honours
Czech Rupublic U-21
FIFA U-20 World Cup runner-up (1) 2007

References

External links
 
 

1988 births
Living people
Sportspeople from Opava
Czech footballers
Czech Republic youth international footballers
Czech Republic under-21 international footballers
Czech expatriate footballers
Czech First League players
SFC Opava players
FC Baník Ostrava players
SK Slavia Prague players
Ligue 1 players
Stade Brestois 29 players
FC Odra Petřkovice players
Expatriate footballers in France
Czech expatriate sportspeople in France
Association football midfielders